John Gregory Bourke (June 23, 1846 – June 8, 1896) was a captain in the United States Army and a prolific diarist and postbellum author; he wrote several books about the American Old West, including ethnologies of its indigenous peoples. He was awarded the Medal of Honor for his actions while a cavalryman in the Union Army during the American Civil War. Based on his service during the war, his commander nominated him to West Point, where he graduated in 1869, leading to service as an Army officer until his death.

Biography
John G. Bourke was born in Philadelphia, Pennsylvania, to Irish immigrant parents, Edward Joseph and Anna (Morton) Bourke.  His early education was extensive and included Latin, Greek, and Gaelic.  When the Civil War began, John Bourke was fourteen.  At sixteen he ran away and lied about his age; claiming to be nineteen, he enlisted in the Fifteenth Pennsylvania Volunteer Cavalry, in which he served until July 1865. He received a Medal of Honor for "gallantry in action" at the Battle of Stones River, Tennessee, in December 1862. He later saw action at the Battle of Chickamauga.

His commander, Major General George H. Thomas, nominated Bourke for West Point.  He was appointed cadet in the United States Military Academy on October 17, 1865. He graduated on June 15, 1869, and was assigned as a second lieutenant in the Third U.S. Cavalry. He served with his regiment at Fort Craig, New Mexico Territory, from September 29, 1869 to February 19, 1870.

He served as an aide to General George Crook in the Apache Wars from 1872 to 1883. As Crook's aide, Bourke had the opportunity to witness every facet of life in the Old West—the battles, wildlife, the internal squabbling among the military, the Indian Agency, settlers, and Native Americans.

Work

Observer
Bourke kept a diary in sequential journals throughout his adult life, documenting his observations in the West. He used these notes as the basis for his later monographs and writings.

During his time as aide to General Crook during the Apache Wars, Bourke kept journals of his observations that were later published as On the Border with Crook. This book is considered one of the best firsthand accounts of frontier army life, as Bourke gives equal time to both the soldier and the Native American. Within it, Bourke describes the landscape, Army life on long campaigns, and his observations of the Native Americans. His passages recounts General Crook's meetings with Sitting Bull, Crazy Horse, and Geronimo as the General attempted to sign peace treaties and relocate tribes to reservations. Bourke provides considerable detail of towns and their citizens in the Southwest, specifically the Arizona Territory.

In 1881 Bourke was a guest of the Zuni Indians, where he was allowed to attend the ceremony of a Newekwe priest. His report of this experience was published in 1888 as The use of human odure and human urine in rites of a religious or semi religious character among various nations.

While in Washington he was on the board of the Anthropological Society.

Rites of All Nations
Several subsequent studies led in 1891 to the completion of his major work  Rites of All Nations: A Dissertation upon the Employment of Excrementicious Remedial Agents in Religion, Therapeutics, Divination, Witch-Craft, Love-Philters, etc. in all part of the Globe. This work was distributed only among selected specialists. A revised German translation by Friedrich S. Krauss was published posthumously in 1913, with a preface by Viennese psychiatrist Sigmund Freud who wrote:

Marriage and family
Bourke married Mary F. Horbach of Omaha, Nebraska, on July 25, 1883. They had three daughters together.

Bourke died in the Polyclinic Hospital in Philadelphia on June 8, 1896, and is buried at Arlington National Cemetery. His wife was buried with him after her death in 1927

Writings

 
   Full-text version also available via Internet Archive.
 
  (See also Ranald Slidell Mackenzie.)
 
   Full-text version also available via Internet Archive.
   Full-text version also available via Internet Archive.
 
 , reprinted from the Journal of American Folk-lore, April–May 1895
 , reprinted from Journal of American Folk-lore, April–June 1896
   Full-text version also available via Internet Archive.

See also

 List of Medal of Honor recipients
 List of American Civil War Medal of Honor recipients: A–F

References

Notes

Literature

Further reading
 Bell, William G. (1978). John Gregory Bourke: A Soldier-scientist of the Frontier. Washington: Potomac Corral, The Westerners.
 Bourke, John G; & Condie, Carol J. (1980). Vocabulary of the Apache or 'Indé language of Arizona & New Mexico. Greeley, CO: Museum of Anthropology, University of Northern Colorado.
 Porter, Joseph C. (1980). John Gregory Bourke: Biographical notes. Greeley, CO: University of Northern Colorado, Museum of Anthropology.

External links
 
 
 
 John Gregory Bourke at ArlingtonCemetery.net, an unofficial website

1846 births
1896 deaths
United States Army Medal of Honor recipients
United States Army officers
United States Military Academy alumni
Union Army officers
American diarists
People of Pennsylvania in the American Civil War
Burials at Arlington National Cemetery
American people of Irish descent
American Civil War recipients of the Medal of Honor
19th-century diarists
Presidents of the American Folklore Society